Frederic High School is a public school for grades 9 through 12 and is located in Frederic, Wisconsin. Frederic High School is within the Frederic 6-12 School.

Frederic High School's athletic teams are a part of the WIAA Lakeland Conference. The athletic teams include baseball, basketball, volleyball, track and field, cross country, wrestling, golf, and softball. In 2012, Frederic and the neighboring village of Luck, Wisconsin joined forces to form an athletic co-op forming the Frederic-Luck track and field, softball, and baseball teams.

References

External links
Frederic High School

Schools in Polk County, Wisconsin
Public high schools in Wisconsin